Logania distanti, the dark mottle, is a small but striking butterfly found in India that belongs to the lycaenids or blues (family Lycaenidae). It was first described by Georg Semper in 1889.

Description

Male
Upperside dark brown. Forewing: a medial dull whitish spot at base of interspace 3 extended upwards on to vein 4 and below into interspace 2. Hindwing; uniform, immaculate. Underside: very pale dull brown, with darker brown mottlings and striae, that on the forewing are absent on a broad streak from base outwards along the basal half of the dorsum, this area pale brown without markings; a dark obscure spot at apex of cell and an incomplete similarly obscure dark transverse discal band. On the hindwing the mottlings coalesce and form three or four very ill-defined, obscure, transverse, somewhat broad bands. Head, thorax and abdomen dark brown. Sex-mark: the base of vein 4 swollen and bare of scales.

Female
"Above black, a round dull white discal area on the forewing from just above the upper median (vein 4) almost to the submedian vein (vein 1). Below irregularly speckled and variegated; forewing with the costal and apical parts ochreous brown, the rest blackish. Hindwing also tinged with ochreous, a submarginal dark area, and obscure dark transverse bands. Hindwing not angled, the margin entire." (Doherty quoted in Bingham)

Range
Assam - Myanmar, Malaya, Borneo?, Thailand, Laos, Sumatra.

Taxonomy
The butterfly is also referred to as Logania massalia Doherty, 1891.

See also
List of butterflies of India
List of butterflies of India (Lycaenidae)

References

External links
 With images.

Logania (butterfly)
Butterflies of Asia
Butterflies of Borneo
Butterflies described in 1889